The 2010–11 PLK season, for sponsorships reasons named the Tauron Basket Liga, was the 83rd edition of Poland's highest tier of professional basketball.

Asseco Prokom Gdynia took the title, after it beat PGE Turów Zgorzelec 4–3 in the Finals.

Regular season 

| rowspan=8 | Qualified for Playoffs

| rowspan=4 | Qualified for Playout

Playoffs

Polish clubs in European competitions

Polish clubs in regional competitions

References

External links
Polska Liga Koszykówki - Official Site 
Polish League at Eurobasket.com

Polish Basketball League seasons
Polish
Lea